The Bermuda Fed Cup team represents Bermuda in Fed Cup tennis competition and are governed by the Bermuda Lawn Tennis Association. They have not competed since 2018.

History
Bermuda competed in its first Fed Cup in 1996.  Their best result was finishing fifth in Group II in 2006.

See also
Fed Cup
Bermuda Davis Cup team

External links

Billie Jean King Cup teams
Fed Cup
Fed Cup